Isabelle Zikai Gbotto Carlsson, better known by the artist name Zikai, born December 2, 1997 in Stockholm is a Swedish singer-songwriter.

Early life 
Isabelle Carlsson has a Swedish mother and a father from Ivory Coast. When Zikai was 15 years old, she was discovered by producer Mack Beats. Soon she wrote text for other artists in Sweden. In 2019, Isabelle started her own artist career under the name Zikai.

Career 
At the age of 15, Zikai began writing songs with the Swedish hip-hop elite and performed with among others, Silvana Imam, Michael Dida and Cherrie. Together with Eva Dahlgren, Zikai joined Silvana Imam on the song Fri which the three of them performed together at the musicfestival Bråvallafestivalen in 2017. She has previously written mostly for other artists. But the music she wrote began to be more about her own life and in 2019 her debut single was released.

2019 
As a songwriter, Zikai wrote songs with Alexander Oscar, Janice and Marcus & Martinus and many more. The song Number with Alexander Oscar sold gold in Denmark and the song Hearts Will Bleed written with Janice became a soundtrack to the game FIFA 20. On January 25, 2019, Zikai released her first song Mountain Peak, which got a big spread through P3, Swedish National Radio. In February, Zikai entered the stage at the Swedish Grammy awards 2019 and performed the song live. Grammy-winning GRADES made a remix of Mountain Peak which was released at the end of March, simultaneously mentioning Zikai as one of his new favorite artists. The song Beach Day was released on May 10, 2019 and in June Zikai was named as the Future Artist by P3. On September 27, the song Liquor Kisses was released. Dopest also listed Zikai as one of the most promising artists on the Swedish music scene in 2019. On December 2, Zikai ended the year with the single Do You Love Me Still?.

2020 
May 8th Zikai’s debut-EP “Make You Mine” was released together with the song “Champagne For Breakfast”. She performed the song on Swedish TV-show Allsång på Skansen later that summer.

In 2020 she also got nominated for a Denniz Pop-Award for Rookie of the year.

In autumn 2020, she got her own talkshow called “Twenty Something Talkshow” on Youtube where she interviewed swedish celebrities. She also performed her song “Twenty Something” on Musikkalendern and on Tolvslaget på Skansen together with SVEA where they performed their version of Rihanna’s “Don’t Stop The Music”.

2021 
Zikai started 2021 with a performance on the TV-show På spåret and got nominated for Gaffa-prize “This year’s breakthrough”.

In February the next single was released - “Stay This Way” together with JIM OUMA and Kes Kross, which she also got to perform on swedish TV-show Go’Kväll.

In April Zikai released her version of Paul Simon's “You Can Call Me Al”.

Most recently Zikai won Sweden's Grammis 2021 for this year's soul/RnB for her debut EP "Make You Mine".

Discography

Singles 

 2019 - Mountain Peak
 2019 - Mountain Peak - GRADES remix
 2019 - Beach Day
 2019 - Liquor Kisses
 2019 - Do You Love Me Still?
2020 - SOS
2020 - Champagne For Breakfast
2020 - Twenty Something
2020 - Don't Stop The Music (with SVEA)
2021 - Stay This Way (with Kes Kross)
2021 - You Can Call Me Al

Songwriting Credits 

 2018 - Invited - Marcus & Martinus
 2018 - Selfish - Liamoo
 2018 - Last breath - Liamoo remix
 2019 - Number - Alexander Oscar
 2019 - Fix you - Marcus & Martinus
 2019 - Chemistry - Alexander Oscar
 2019 - I’m good - Katie Keller
 2019 - Hearts will bleed - Janice
 2019 - Issues - Liamoo
2019 - run. - doppio - Anton. Andersson, Christine Balk
2020 - Hush - Yellow Claw, Weird Genius, Reikko
2020 - Bad Intenstions - Alexander Oscar
2020 - Sharper - Peder Elias ft. Zikai
2020 - I Could - Phlake
2020 - I Could - Phlake, Mercedes the virus
2020 - Fire - Mullally ft Zikai
2020 - Obsession - DJ Soda & RayRay

References 

1997 births
Swedish singer-songwriters

Living people
Swedish people of Ivorian descent